Collapse (also known as Collapse: Devastated World) is an action game released in 2008 for Microsoft Windows. It was developed by Creoteam, a company based in Ukraine. The game is notable for combining Quick Time Events and sword battles similar to God of War series, third-person shooting, and a setting similar to S.T.A.L.K.E.R.: Shadow of Chernobyl. The soundtrack was composed by the Russian electronic band .

Gameplay

The gameplay is divided into sections where a player is encouraged to use either swords or guns. The shooting section is similar to many third-person shooters, while the close-range combat is similar to the God of War series. Boss battles are usually finished using quick time events. Many of the locations in the game are based on real-life Kyiv places, such as Maidan Nezalezhnosti and Kyiv Pechersk Lavra.

Plot
The story is set in 2096 in Kyiv, Ukraine, a city that turned into the center of the Zone. The Zone was created after a strange interdimensional rift opened, leading the city and all surrounding areas to be infested with outwardly beasts and dangerous anomalies. The rift become known as the Hole.  To stop the spread of the Zone, a quarantine was declared, and all the inhabitants of the place became hostages. At first, the Zone was controlled by scientists and militia, but due to monster attacks and strong aggression from the locals, the Zone soon became divided between various bandit clans led by so-called Lords. The city itself and surrounding area of the Zone became known as the Junkyard.

Rodan, the main hero of the story, is a Lord of one such clan, who is going to participate in a meeting of Lords. The meeting turns out to be a trap by Lord Mark, the leader of a clan of fanatics who worship him as a messiah. Rodan is forced to fight back with his swords, various weaponry and telekinetic powers granted by the Zone's anomalous power. He soon finds out that there is much more to worry about than just a new clan war, as he is forced to confront an enigmatic and very powerful man whose ambition threatens not only to safety of the Zone, but to the whole world outside. During his journey, Rodan also has to uncover the mystery of his past and the secret of the inter-dimensional rift, the Hole itself.

Development
A patch was released, updating game to version 1.1. The patch fixed most of the problems with gameplay balance and bring some new effects to the game. It was highly recommended to download the patch, as it improves the game drastically.

Collapse: The Rage
A stand-alone expansion entitled Collapse: The Rage was released in 2010. It continues the story of Rodan after the destruction of the Hole. The features include improved ranged and close combat mechanics, new special effects and the "Rage" mode.

Reception
The game received mixed reviews. Many critics praised the unusual setting, hack'n'slash mixed with shooting, and soundtrack. However, the game was highly criticised for simplicity of its combat system, repetitive gameplay and poor design of some characters.

Reviews
Igray.ru
BestGamer.ru
Absolute Games (AG.ru)
IGROMANIA
7Wolf Magazine

References

External links
 Official website 
 Steam game page

2008 video games
Action-adventure games
Hack and slash games
Post-apocalyptic video games
Third-person shooters
Video games developed in Ukraine
Video games set in Ukraine
Windows games
Windows-only games
Buka Entertainment games
Single-player video games